Westminster Area Community Awareness Action Team is 501 (c)(3) nonprofit organization based in the City of Westminster, Colorado.

Taken from the group's bylaws:

"The corporation believes that the use of drugs by our nation's young is a societal problem. Therefore, all segments of society must be involved in its solution. With parents, health professionals, law enforcement officials, court officials, educators, legislators, media, business, government agencies, religious groups, concerned individuals, and young people themselves, working collectively toward a common goal, the goal can be achieved. A commitment is needed by each of us if our young people are to have the opportunity to grow up drug free."

History 
Westminster Area CAAT was formed in 1981 with the name Westminster-District 50 DARE. The organization changed their name to Westminster Area CAAT on April 18, 1989.

Programs 
Westminster Area CAAT plans and organizes several events that recur monthly and annually in order to support its mission of promoting a healthy, drug-free lifestyle in the community.

Red Ribbon Week 
Red Ribbon Week is celebrated every year from October 23–31. Westminster CAAT offers several resources to community schools in order that they observe this event. For many years, both the City of Westminster and Adams County School District 50 have issued a proclamation designating the observation of Red Ribbon Week.

School / Community Meetings 
Meetings occur monthly from September to May. Attendees include area school administrators, personnel, parents, law enforcement, community agencies and nonprofit organizations. Members of the community are encouraged to attend. Topics range from bullying, substance abuse, drug trends, recreational marijuana legalization, human trafficking, and gang activity.

Just Say No Week 
Just Say No Week is held every year during the first week of May. Many activities occur throughout the school district, including the sponsoring of a poster contest by Westminster Area CAAT. Students in first through fifth grade are encouraged to submit a poster that artistically portrays the theme of that year's Just Say No Week.

Youth Conference

Positions on Issues

Amendment 64 
Westminster Area CAAT adopted an opposing position on ballot measure Amendment 64, which would allow the "personal use and regulation of marijuana" for adults 21 and over in Colorado.

Funding / Awards 
For the year 2012, Westminster Area CAAT has received competitively awarded small grants from the Legacy Foundation and Wells Fargo (third year awarded).

See also
Just Say No

References

Westminster, Colorado